Eetu Pöysti (born 16 January 1989) is a Finnish professional ice hockey forward who currently plays for KooKoo in the Liiga.

Playing career 
Pöysti started in the youth system of Helsinki-based club HIFK and made his debut on the club's senior team in Finland's top-tier Liiga during the 2007–08 season. In 2010, he captured the Liiga title with HIFK. Following the 2011–12 season, Pöysti transferred to fellow Liiga outfit Espoo Blues, where he would spend two years.

He joined Jokerit for their maiden season in the Kontinental Hockey League (KHL) from rivals Espoo Blues on 7 April 2014. After two years at the club, Pöysti signed with newly founded HC Red Star Kunlun, the first Chinese member of the KHL, in July 2016.

References

External links
 

1989 births
Espoo Blues players
Finnish ice hockey forwards
HIFK (ice hockey) players
Jokerit players
Kiekko-Vantaa players
HC Kunlun Red Star players
Living people
Ice hockey people from Helsinki